The 1980 UCLA Bruins football team was an American football team that represented the University of California, Los Angeles during the 1980 NCAA Division I-A football season.  In their fifth year under head coach Terry Donahue, the Bruins compiled a 9–2 record (5–2 Pac-10), finished in second place in the Pacific-10 Conference, and were ranked #13 in the final AP Poll.

UCLA's offensive leaders in 1980 were quarterback Tom Ramsey with 1,116 passing yards, running back Freeman McNeil with 1,105 rushing yards, and wide receiver Cormac Carney with 591 receiving yards.

Schedule

Personnel

Game summaries

Colorado

at Ohio State

USC

Terry Donahue's first win versus USC

Team players in the NFL
The following players were drafted into professional football following the season.

Awards and honors
 Kenny Easley, S, All American (consensus), All-Conference Honor
 Irv Eatman, DT, All-Conference Honor
 Avon Riley, LB, All-Conference Honor
 Tim Wrightman, TE, All-Conference Honor
 Larry Lee, OG, All-Conference Honor
 Freeman McNeil, TB, All American, All-Conference Honor

References

UCLA
UCLA Bruins football seasons
UCLA Bruins football
UCLA Bruins football